Plattin Township is an inactive township in Jefferson County, in the U.S. state of Missouri.

Plattin Township takes its name from Plattin Creek.

References

Townships in Missouri
Townships in Jefferson County, Missouri